A Grand crossing is a bridge or tunnel at a major water body.

Grand Crossing may also refer to a place in the United States:

Grand Crossing, Florida
Greater Grand Crossing, Chicago, Illinois